Eve Brenner (born Evelyn Halpern; May 19, 1926) is an American actress. She appeared in various films and television shows such as Baskets, The Sarah Silverman Program, Dragnet, Touched by an Angel, The X-Files, The Twilight Zone and The Bold and the Beautiful.

Career 
Brenner started her career as "Betty" (under her real name, "Evelyn Halpern") in a 1953 episode ("A Ghost for Scotland Yard") of Adventures of Superman. Her next role was not until 1965 in the film Rat Fink. Years later, she appeared in other television series and films as well as The Twilight Zone (1985–1989), Murder She Wrote (1984–1996), The Bold and the Beautiful (1987), The X-Files (1993–2018), Touched by an Angel (1994–2003), The McCarthys (2014–2015) and Baskets (2016–2019). She voiced The Mouse Queen in Disney animated film The Great Mouse Detective (1986).

Filmography

References

External links 

1926 births
Living people
Actresses from San Diego
American film actresses
American television actresses